The ATP Birmingham, also known as the Birmingham International Indoor Championships, was a men's tennis tournament played on indoor carpet courts in Birmingham, Alabama, United States, from 1973 until 1980.  The tournament was a part of the USLTA Indoor Circuit from 1973 through 1975, of the World Championship Tennis series in 1977 and of the Grand Prix circuit from 1978 until the last edition in 1980.  Jimmy Connors won the singles title six times out of the eight times the tournament was held.

Results

Singles

Doubles

External links
 ATP World Tour archive

Birmingham
Grand Prix tennis circuit
Birmingham
Birmingham
Sports in Birmingham, Alabama
Tennis tournaments in Alabama
Defunct tennis tournaments in the United States
1973 establishments in Alabama
1980 disestablishments in Alabama
Recurring sporting events established in 1973
Recurring sporting events disestablished in 1980
Birmingham International Indoor Championships